Ghayāthī, with 14,022 inhabitants (2005 census), is a town in the western region of the Emirate of Abu Dhabi. Originally a bedouin settlement, today many inhabitants work in agriculture.

The principal road is E15, which connects the town with the E11 near Ruwais in the north, and Aradah in the Liwa Oasis in the south. Another road leads to Madinat Zayed.

References

External links
 Life in Gayathi Blog 2016

Populated places in the Emirate of Abu Dhabi
Western Region, Abu Dhabi